Katharina tunicata (Wood, 1815) is commonly known as the black Katy chiton, black Leather chiton, black chiton, or leather chiton, (Kasuqix in the indigenous Aleut language), is a species of chiton in the family Mopaliidae.

Description
Capable of growing up to 12 cm, the animal is generally described as being football-shaped with a black leathery girdle in which are embedded  eight protective plates. The parts of the plates that are visible are sometimes (but not always) diamond-shaped in outline.  The underside of the animal is dull orange or yellow.

Anatomy
From the dorsal view, the mantle, girdle, and 8 valves are easily distinguishable.  The girdle is covered with a chitinous cuticle.  The ventral side shows the muscular foot surrounded by the gills on either side.  This view also shows the mouth, anterior to the foot, and the anus, posterior to the foot encompassed by the mantle cavity and pallial fold which is then surrounded by the girdle.  The gonopores are located at the posterior end just above the anus.  The internal anatomy consists of a complete gut, a nervous system with two visceral nerve cords and two serving the foot, and a hemal system composed of the heart, vessels, and unlined sinuses that make the hemocoel.

Feeding habits
Like other chitons, it is a slow moving grazer that consumes several species of brown and red algae including kelps, sea lettuce, and encrusting diatoms.  They're also known to eat sponges, tiny barnacles, spirobid polychaetes, and bryozoans.  Their predators include sea urchins, leather stars, black oystercatchers, glaucous-winged gulls, and humans.

Reproduction
Black Katy chitons are primarily dioecious, diploid organisms.  They reach sexual maturity at about 35mm in length.  The decrease in temperature experienced around fall will trigger within a newly settled organism the growth of the gonads.  Around springtime, the increase in temperatures will trigger the actual production of gametes.  Males will first disperse their sperm into the tides which will then induce nearby females to launch their eggs forth to be fertilized.  Settlement of the organism is influenced by the presence of coralline algae.  Gametogenesis takes place for 5 months of the year, and most of these chitons will live through the reproduction cycle about 3 times.

Chitons undergo biochemical changes through the processes of sexual maturity and reproduction.  Studies have been conducted, using K. tunicata, pertaining to the ratio of neutral and polar lipids found within the organism at different stages of its life.

Distribution
Its distribution ranges from Kamchatka, Russia through the Aleutian Islands to southern California. However, modern, accurate surveys do not exist.

Habitat
These chitons can be found in intertidal zones to 40m depths.  Heavy waves on rocky shores are favorable.  K. tunicata is unique compared to other chitons in that it tolerates direct sunlight.

These intertidal zones are susceptible to contamination from industrial activities, timber harvesting, mining, seafood processing, as well as coastal development.  Over-visitation and over-harvesting are a common concern. Effects of climate change, present and future, are not fully understood but it will probably affect the diversity and structure of the intertidal communities K. tunicata reside in. This species is protected in the USA under the Coastal Zone Management Act.

As food
The indigenous peoples of California cook this animal on coals or in an earth oven.

References

Chitons
Chitons described in 1815
Edible molluscs
Seafood in Native American cuisine